Plahn Nyarn District is one of the 16 districts in Sinoe County, Liberia. The distract is named after the Plain tribe and had a population of 6,805 as of the year 2008.

History of The Plain Tribe 
Written by Dr. P. Potter Pajibo

To begin with the history of the Plain tribe, it must be assumed that the Tribe had its origin from the Cavalla River (Jubu), in the eastern part of Sinoe County. It's descendancy links with the Grebo Tribe, and for this fact, the tribe is usually referred to as Bush Grebo.

The continued rift between the Grebo Tribe and the Plahn Tribe stirred up a series of intertribal wars, and the latter was forced to leave in such of a suitable place for abode under the leadership of Tarjuo, a doctor and warrior. The people of the Plahn Tribe traveled for months and at last reached a certain mountain, now called “Tarjuo Mountain”, in honor of their leader Tarjuo. He is also after whom the Tarjuozon Tribes named where they decided to settle.

The decision to make Tarjuo Mountain their home was unanimous among the people of the Plain Tribe. They settled and remained there for a few years until the death of the leader, Tarjuo.

When Tarjuo died, the Plahn Tribe people felt discouraged; and after a deep contemplation, decided to leave the Tarjuo Mountain. Because of their strong conviction in superstition, the tribal people found the mountain unsuitable to live, and felt that upon their failure to leave, they would suffer an untimely death.

Under the leadership of one of Tarjuo’s sons, Plahn, after whom the tribe is named, the group left the Tarjuo Mountain in search of another place for settlement. For months they traveled so many miles and finally reach a certain creek, called “Slae-Nee” meaning Magic Creek. This was their final destination and settlement. Tribal legend says that when they reached this area, a vision of a bright future was formed; previous conflicts and disturbances were decreased. They believed that this creek also greatly and surprisingly aided their tribe during a war between them and the Krahn people.

The main cause of the tribe’s decision to settle around the Slae-Nee Creek was for protection. Since the organization and establishment of the Plahn Tribe, the people of said tribe have been worshipping the Slae – Nee Creek as one of their tribal gods.

From the earliest memories of the tribe, the following people are said to have been some of the most outstanding leaders of the tribe; included are those who have contributed and accomplished much to its development:

 Chief Jowiehfueh
 Chief Sworrfueh
 Chief Gbartieh Jarfueh
 Chief Gborpannon
 Chief Gbarweh Nuon
 Chief Karjah
 Chief Dopaetron
 Chief Wiehkue
 Chief Kujah Sworrfueh

Because of lack of written records, nothing much can be said about their contributions made. However, it is said that they had ably conducted and protected the affairs of the tribe. 

Since its establishment, there have been diverse kinds of tribal governments. Since there was no mentioned central government at the time, the tribesmen organized themselves into a strong body of local tribal government and elected Jowiehfueh as their first chief or king. He is said to have faithfully conducted the affairs of the tribe to the best of his ability and remained in power until his death.

Since the death of the first king Jowiehfueh, there has been a succession of others up to the present as listed below:

Paramount Chiefs:

 Pantonteh
 Jarkue Wolloh
 Teah-Deboe Pajibo
 Wrogbo Jah
 Weagbah
 Tanneh Weah
 Torteh

Clan Chiefs:

 Pantonteh
 Kietegbeh
 Nyonuwion
 Nyenfueh
 Tanneh Weah – Plahn
 Weagbah – Kulu
 Pobleh – Nyarn
 Pallaywion - Shoah
 Tanneh Weah - Plahn
 Torteh - Nyarn
 Falleh – Puea - Kulu
 Borjobo – Buer – Shoah
 David Pyne - Plahn
 Torteh - Nyarn
 Wionjuo - Kulu
 Borjobo – Buer -Shoah
 Brown Nyenfueh – Plahn/Nyarn
 Wionjuo - Kulu/Shoah

Government 
The tribe as a whole is divided into three main family groups comprising twelve subdivisions. The reasons for the divisions are on account of repeated conflicts and dissatisfactions among the three distinct original families. They felt that this would enable them to multiply, expand and to build the tribe more effectively. They also wanted a separate and independent leadership for each division.

Below are the three original family groups and their subdivisions:

Plentarh Group

a) Chuoh

b) Sworrh

c) Kaetarh

d) Gedaquen

Snoh – Dea – Quen

a) Weorh

b) Tartouh

c) Wenjaoh

d) Saoh

Barlor – Quen

a) Chuoh

b) Swisslow

c) Tuon

d) Clayar – Quen

Legend suggests that all tribes were, from the beginning, wandering from place to place in search of suitable sites for settlements. The Plahn Tribe therefore did not come in contact with any tribal group in traveling from the Cavalla River area and Tarjuo Mountain.

Economy and Culture 
The sum total of the attainments and activities – the culture and economy – of the tribe is the producing of wooden utensils such as spoons, and pans; clay pots for cooking and water buckets; the first clothing were made or obtained from bamboo limps, barks of trees, etc.; melted rocks to make cutlasses and spears; and the making of rattan baskets and chairs acquired from other neighboring tribes.

Religion 
Their religious background was through their various tribal gods such as Slae – Nee Creek, the Rock Wiah, Kae – Gedoe – Plie, Nyanfurh, and Genopuarch. In the event of war with other tribe, a special selected group of the Plahn Tribe would go to these gods and make sacrifices. Their belief was that these gods would help avoid the war, and would make the tribe very wealthy and productive for abode.

Nowadays, most of these gods have been abandoned and replaced by Christianity. This is the result of colonialist missionary efforts affecting tribal culture and the inhabitants of the tribe.

Present Day 
There is no record of the Plahn Tribe when engaged in conflict or war with the colonists or the pioneers who came from America. There has also been no war between the Plahn and the Sinoe tribes, known as Murrayville Settlement in Sinoe County. These two tribes have been very friendly since their settlement and were kind to the colonists.

Today, members of the Plahn Tribe from Tarjuozon District in Sinoe County can be found all over the globe. According to the latest census from the Liberian government, Plahn Nyarn District has a little over 428 inhabitants.

References

Districts of Liberia
Sinoe County